Ebernoe Common is a  biological Site of Special Scientific Interest in Ebernoe, north of Petworth in West Sussex. It is a Nature Conservation Review site, Grade I, a national nature reserve and a Special Area of Conservation. It is managed by the Sussex Wildlife Trust

This site consists of several blocks of ancient woodland. It is nationally important for lichens, with over 100 species, and for fungi, with seven Red Data Book species. It is also nationally important for woodland breeding birds and for bats, especially barbastelles and Bechstein’s.

References

Sussex Wildlife Trust
Sites of Special Scientific Interest in West Sussex
National nature reserves in England
Special Areas of Conservation in England
Forests and woodlands of West Sussex